Amazing Grace is an album by Judy Collins, released in 1985 by the UK record label Telstar. It was her first album after ending her 24-year association with Elektra and was recorded and released in 1985 in the UK as a Christmas offering. It has only been available in the United States as an import, although seven of the tracks can be found on her 1987 US release from Gold Castle, Trust Your Heart.

At 16 tracks and nearly an hour in duration, this was Collins' longest album to date.  It is the first album the artist had released where she has recorded covers of songs that could be considered the "signature songs" of several other artists, including Simon and Garfunkel, Joni Mitchell, Bette Midler and Cat Stevens.

Track listing 
 "Amazing Grace" (John Newton) – 3:53
 "Day by Day" (Godspell) (Stephen Schwartz, John-Michael Tebelak) – 3:14
 "Bridge Over Troubled Water" (Paul Simon) – 4:32
 "I Don't Know How To Love Him" (Jesus Christ Superstar) (Tim Rice, Andrew Lloyd Webber) – 3:50
 "Both Sides Now" (Joni Mitchell) – 3:32
 "Abide With Me" (Henry Francis Lyte, William Henry Monk) – 3:05
 "Just a Closer Walk with Thee" (Traditional) - 3:27
 "When You Wish Upon a Star"(Leigh Harline, Ned Washington) – 2:47
 "When a Child is Born" (Fred Jay (translator), Ciro Dammicco (alias Zacar)) – 3:23
 "The Rose" (Amanda McBroom) – 5:08
 "One Day at a Time" (Kris Kristofferson, Marijohn Wilkin) - 3:46
 "Oh Happy Day" (Edwin Hawkins) – 3:32
 "Morning Has Broken" (Eleanor Farjeon, Cat Stevens) – 2:48
 "Send in the Clowns" (Stephen Sondheim) - 4:08
 "The Lord is my Shepherd" - 2:44
 "Jerusalem" (William Blake, Hubert Parry) – 2:19

Personnel
Judy Collins  – vocals, guitar, keyboards, background vocals, arrangements
Christopher Warren-Green - violin solo
Stephen Hill Singers - vocals
Trinity Boys Choir - vocals
United Kingdom Symphony Orchestra - background orchestral music
Tony Britten - conductor, arrangements
Rolf Wilson - orchestra leader
Roy Gillard - orchestra leader
Eric Knight - arrangements
Shelton Knight - arrangements
Jonathan Tunick - arrangements

References

External links section 
Judy Collins official website
Rolf Wilson biography
Stephen Hill biography at the Royal Academy of Music site

Judy Collins albums
1987 albums
Telstar Records albums
Albums recorded at Olympic Sound Studios